Dr Basil George von Brandis Melle (31 March 1891 – 8 January 1966) was a South African first-class cricketer who played as a right-handed batsman and bowled right-arm medium pace and later leg breaks. David Frith saw Melle as playing a role in the origins of bodyline bowling through his 'inswingers with three short-legs'.

Melle made his first-class debut for Western Province in 1909 against Eastern Province. He played nine first-class matches for the province from 1909 to 1911, with his final match coming against Transvaal. In his nine matches for Western Province he scored 439 runs at a batting average of 31.35, with 2 half centuries and a single century score of 145 against Griqualand West in 1911.

In 1911 Melle played single first-class matches for The Rest against Transvaal and for PT Lewis' XI against LJ Tancred's XI.

Melle later moved to England to study at the University of Oxford, where he represented the university cricket team. He made his debut for the university in 1913 against HK Foster's XI. Melle represented the university in 15 first-class matches in 1913 and 1914, winning a cricket Blue in both years, before first-class cricket was suspended owing to the onset of the First World War. Melle's final match for the university was the University Match against Cambridge University at Lord's. In his 15 matches for the University Melle scored 497 runs at a batting average of 20.70, with three half centuries and a high score of 72 against Sussex in 1913. With the ball he took 74 wickets at a bowling average of 20.04 with six five wicket hauls, one ten wicket haul in a match and best figures of 7/48 against the Marylebone Cricket Club in 1913. Melle led the university's averages in 1913 with 55 wickets at an average of 15.90. Melle helped Oxford gain a convincing 194-run victory against Cambridge in 1914 but, not long afterwards, when he had bowled a mere six overs with the new ball in a match at Trent Bridge he was handed a telegram. He had been called up by the Oxford University detachment of the King's Colonial Corps and left the field immediately. Captain Melle's best cricket years were to be lost to the War which had been declared two days earlier.

Earlier in 1914, Melle had made his debut for Hampshire in the County Championship against Essex. He played 3 matches for the county before the war and a further 24 after the war from 1919 to 1921. In his 27 appearances for Hampshire, he scored 1,207 runs at an average of 29.43, with six half-centuries and a single century score of 110. During his time with Hampshire his bowling had declined to such an extent that it was seldom used in matches. Still, Melle took 25 wickets an average of 42.96, with two five-wicket hauls and best figures of 5–70 against Kent in 1919.

While in England Melle played a single first-class match for the Free Foresters against Oxford University in 1919. He also represented the Marylebone Cricket Club in two first-class matches against Oxford University and Cambridge University in 1919.

Melle returned to South Africa at some point after 1921. In 1923 he joined Transvaal where he made his debut for them against Orange Free State in the 1923/24 Currie Cup. He played for Transvaal three times in competition, with his final first-class match coming against Western Province, scoring 161 runs at an average of 32.20, with a single half century score of 59 against Natal, and taking 8 wickets at an average of 20.50, with one five wicket haul of 5/47 against Natal.

In Melle's overall first-class career he scored 2,535 runs at an average of 27.55, with 13 half-centuries, 3 centuries and a high score of 145. With the ball he took 114 wickets at a bowling average of 25.71, with nine five-wicket hauls, a single ten-wicket haul in a match and best figures of 7/48. In the field Melle took 33 catches.

Melle died at Johannesburg, Gauteng, on 8 January 1966.

Family
Melle's son Michael played Test cricket for South Africa as well as first-class cricket for Transvaal and Western Province.

References

External links

Matches and detailed statistics for Basil Melle

1891 births
1966 deaths
Alumni of Brasenose College, Oxford
South African cricketers
Western Province cricketers
Oxford University cricketers
Hampshire cricketers
Free Foresters cricketers
Marylebone Cricket Club cricketers
Gauteng cricketers
People from Somerset West
Cricketers from the Western Cape